The 2017–18 South Dakota State Jackrabbits men's basketball team represented South Dakota State University during the 2017–18 NCAA Division I men's basketball season. The Jackrabbits, led by second-year head coach T. J. Otzelberger, played their home games at Frost Arena in Brookings, South Dakota as members of the Summit League. They finished the season 28–7, 13–1 in Summit League play to win the Summit League regular season championship. In the Summit League tournament, they defeated Western Illinois, North Dakota State, and South Dakota to become Summit League Tournament champions. They received the Summit League's automatic bid to the NCAA tournament where they lost in the first round to Ohio State.

Previous season 
The Jackrabbits finished the 2016–17 season 18–17, 8–8 in Summit League play to finish in a three-way tie for fourth place. As the No. 4 seed in the Summit League tournament, they defeated Denver, South Dakota, and Omaha to win the tournament championship. As a result, they earned the league's automatic bid to the NCAA tournament. As the No. 16 seed in the West region, they lost in the first round to Gonzaga.

Preseason 
In a poll of league coaches, media, and sports information directors, the Jackrabbits were picked to win the Summit League. Junior forward Mike Daum was named the preseason Summit League Player of the Year. Senior forward Reed Tellinghuisen was named to the preseason All-Summit League Second Team.

Roster

Schedule and results

|-
!colspan=9 style=| Exhibition

|-
!colspan=9 style=| Non-conference regular season 

|-
!colspan=9 style=| Summit League regular season

|-
!colspan=9 style=| Summit League tournament

|-
!colspan=9 style=| NCAA tournament

Source

References

South Dakota State Jackrabbits men's basketball seasons
South Dakota State
2017 in sports in South Dakota
2018 in sports in South Dakota
South Dakota State